Konstantin Mikhailovich Bakharev (Ukrainian: Костянтин Михайлович Бахарєв; Russian: Константин Михайлович Бахарев; born 20 October 1972), is a Russian and former Ukrainian politician and journalist. He has been a member of parliament of the Russian State Duma since 5 October 2016 and Deputy Chairman of the State Duma Committee on Financial Markets since 24 October 2019. He is also a member of the Presidium of the General Council of the United Russia party, and the head of the interregional coordinating council of the party in the Southern Federal District.

Bakharev was also the First Deputy Chairman of the Provisional Occupation of Russia in the State Council of the Republic of Crimea from 2014 to 2016. He also served as the First Deputy Chairman of the Verkhovna Rada of Crimea from 2010 to 2011.

Biography
Konstantin Bakharev was born in Simferopol on 20 October 1972, the son of Mykhaylo Oleksiyovych, former deputy chief of the Crimean parliament. In 1992, he graduated from Comprehensive School No. 18, Simferopol. In 1994, he studied at the MV Frunze Simferopol State University with a Russian language and literature degree.

Bakharev was the deputy general director of the Closed Joint Stock Company Investment Fund Crimean Privatization since September 1994. From September 1997 to May 2006, he was the deputy chairman of the Board of the LLC "Editorial Office of the newspaper . In May 2006, he became the editor-in-chief of the newspaper.

From 2006 to 2010, Bakharev was a Supreme Council of Crimea's 5th convocation member. From 16 November 2010 to 21 December 2011, he became the First Deputy Chairman of the Supreme Council of Crimea. In 2012, he was a member of the Party of Regions and was nominated as a People's Deputy of Ukraine from the party. From 2010 to 2014, he was a member of the Supreme Council of Crimea's 6th convocation. From 21 December 2011 to 21 March 2014, he became the chairman of the Standing Commission of the Supreme Council of Crimea on rule-making activities, organization of the work of the Supreme Council, and public relations.

On 5 April 2014, Bakharev became a member of the United Russia party. From 2014 to 2016, he was a member of the State Council of the Republic of Crimea's 1st convocation. From 21 March 2014 to 1 August 2014, Bakharev was a Deputy Chairman of the State Council of the Republic of Crimea. From 1 August 2014 to 23 September 2016, Bakharev was the First Deputy Chairman of the State Council of the Republic of Crimea.  Since 6 February 2016, he has been a member of the General Council of the United Russia party.

On 5 October 2016, Bakharev became a member of the State Duma of the VII convocation in the Kerch single-mandate constituency No. 20. Since 23 December 2017, he has been a member of the Presidium of the General Council of the United Russia party, and the head of the Interregional Coordination Council for the Southern Federal District.

The  suspects Bakharev of high treason and has placed him on their wanted list.

Legislative Activity
Bakharev co-authored 28 legislative initiatives and amendments to draft federal laws between 2016 and 2020 during his term of office in the 7th State Duma.

Family
Bakharev is married and has two sons. His wife, Nonna, is Georgian by nationality and is the president of a charitable organization.

References

1972 births
Living people
Politicians from Simferopol
Party of Regions politicians
United Russia politicians
Seventh convocation members of the State Duma (Russian Federation)
Eighth convocation members of the State Duma (Russian Federation)
Tavrida National V.I. Vernadsky University alumni
Recipients of the Order of Merit (Ukraine), 3rd class
20th-century Ukrainian journalists
21st-century Ukrainian journalists
Ukrainian editors
Russian individuals subject to European Union sanctions